The Downing Point Battery was a World War I coastal gun battery defending the Firth of Forth. The battery was constructed in 1914 at Downing Point, then part of the Earl of Moray’s Donibristle Estate. The site is now situated within the new town of Dalgety Bay in Fife.

Forth defence lines
In the First World War three lines of defence were established on the Firth of Forth to protect Rosyth Naval Dockyard, then home to the Battle Cruiser Fleet. These lines of defence were known as the Outer, Middle and Inner Defence Lines. 

The Outer Line ran from a gun battery at Kinghorn to a battery at Leith Docks, with fortified gun emplacements on the island of Inchkeith.

The Middle Line ran from Braefoot Battery in the North to a battery on Cramond Island in the South, with fortified gun emplacements on the islands of Inchcolm and Inchmickery. 

The Inner Line was situated close to the Forth Bridge, with batteries at Downing Point on the North coast and Hound Point on the South coast of the firth. Additional batteries were located at Carlingnose Point, Dalmeny, and on the island of Inchgarvie. Each line of defence also had an associated anti-submarine boom.

Battery specification

The Downing Point Battery incorporated two gun emplacements, each was initially equipped with a QF 4.7-inch Mk I – IV naval gun, designed to engage enemy surface vessels threatening ships at anchor in the Firth of Forth  and the naval facilities at Rosyth Dockyard. Each 4.7 inch gun could fire a shell weighing 20kg out to range of 11km.

In June 1917 the two 4.7 inch guns were transferred to the battery on Inchcolm Island and replaced with two QF 12-pounder 18 cwt naval guns taken from the island. These 12-pounder guns could fire a 5kg shell out to a range of 8.5km.

A thin promontory of rock runs to the East from gun emplacements, this promontory housed two Defence Electric Lights  - powerful searchlights designed to illuminate targets for the guns at night. One DEL was of the kind where the light could be moved to follow a target; the other produced a fixed beam, illuminating an area of water on which the guns were already pre-ranged.

The battery was manned by men of the Forth Royal Garrison Artillery and Royal Engineers.

It was important to ensure that coast defence batteries were not put out of action by enemy troops landing and attacking them from the landward side. The Downing Point battery was surrounded by both a plain wire fence and a barbed wire entanglement that ran out onto the beach along the northern side. There were also four blockhouses within the perimeter.

The battery was further defended by an outer perimeter of six blockhouses positioned between 250 and 400m from the battery. The blockhouses were built of wood with pitched wood and felt roofs, internally there was a stove and bunks for 10 men. The blockhouses were made bulletproof with the addition of a sandbag wall placed approximately one metre away from the wooden structure.

History

Authority to proceed with construction was given in September 1914 with a budget of £450. To equip the battery two 4.7 inch guns were transferred from the Kinghorn Battery and mounted at Downing Point in October 1914. 

Later in the war the fleet anchorages moved East of the Forth Bridge and consequently the Outer and Middle Defence Lines were given priority and strengthened at the expense of the Inner Line. The 4.7 inch guns were transferred to the Inchcolm Battery in June 1917, with a pair of 12-pounder guns transferred from the island and installed at Downing Point.

Current status

Visitors today can still access the two concrete gun emplacements from the Downing Point Battery,  which offer a commanding view over the River Forth. A range finder post is situated between the two gun emplacements but this is now partially collapsed. 

The site can be accessed by the public via Bathing House Wood, on a trail that forms part of the Fife Coastal Path. The Dalgety Bay Community Woodlands Group maintain the surrounding woodland area and have erected an information board commemorating the battery site.

The majority of Battery buildings such as the barracks, magazine, engine room and defensive blockhouses are no longer present at the site. The surrounding area was developed in to residential housing during the 1960s. It is still possible to observe the exposed concrete bases of the magazine, generator house, and ablutions blocks to the north of the site.

See also 
 Firth of Forth
 Braefoot Battery

References 

British World War I defensive lines

Coastal fortifications
Fortification lines
Firth of Forth
20th-century fortifications
World War I sites in the United Kingdom